Apertura is an album by Mats Gustafsson and David Grubbs, released on July 6, 1999, through Blue Chopsticks.

Track listing

Personnel 
Musicians
David Grubbs – Harmonium
Mats Gustafsson – tenor saxophone, flute
Production and additional personnel
Bundy K. Brown – recording
Gaylen Gerber – cover art

References 

1999 albums
Collaborative albums
David Grubbs albums